Padhariya or Padharia is the name of a tribe found in the Saurashtra, Kutch, Banaskantha, Rewakantha and Dang regions of Gujarat, India.

References

Social groups of Gujarat
Tribes of Kutch
Hindu communities